Rahere (pronounced ), or Raher or Raherius, was an Anglo-Norman priest and monk. He was a favourite of King Henry I and is most famous for having founded the Priory of the Hospital of St Bartholomew in 1123. 
 
Many of the details of Rahere's life have become confused, having been variously described as a cleric, a courtier, a minstrel and a jester, but undoubtedly Rahere existed and did many of the things in the legends about him. He may at different times in his life have been all of these.

Rahere is listed as a canon of St Paul's Cathedral in a document of 1115. On a pilgrimage to Rome, he fell ill and had a reputed vision of St Bartholomew, who directed him to establish a religious hospital. Upon his return to England, he followed this calling and founded a priory at Smithfield in London, being installed as its prior, a position he held until his death. An ornate tomb in his memory can be found inside the Priory Church of St Bartholomew the Great.

He is the subject of Rudyard Kipling's poem "Rahere", collected in Debits and Credits, as well as being a major figure in Kipling's story "The Tree of Justice", featuring in Rewards and Fairies. He is also a significant character in Rosemary Sutcliff's historical novel for children, The Witch's Brat (1970). It seems likely that Sutcliff was first introduced to Rahere by reading Kipling's Rewards and Fairies as a child and later chose him as a character for one of her own books: Kipling's works are a significant and openly acknowledged inspiration for Sutcliff.

References

Further reading

External links 
 Rahere's grant
 Photograph of Rahere's tomb in the church of St Bartholomew-the-Great
 Notes on the poem "Rahere"
 

1144 deaths
12th-century English people
Augustinian canons
English officers of arms